Emmrich is a German surname. Notable people with the surname include:

Hermann Friedrich Emmrich (1815–1879), German geologist
Martin Emmrich (born 1984), former German tennis player 
Rolf Emmrich (1910–1974), German professor of internal medicine
Thomas Emmrich (born 1953), former East German tennis player

See also
 Emmerich (name)
 Emmerich (disambiguation)

German-language surnames
Surnames from given names